St Ives Lifeboat Station is the base for Royal National Lifeboat Institution (RNLI) search and rescue operations at St Ives, Cornwall in the United Kingdom. The first lifeboat was built for the town in 1840 and the present boathouse was opened in 1994. It operates a  all weather boat (AWB) and a  inshore lifeboat (ILB).

History
St Ives is an historic fishing port in west Cornwall and offers a sheltered harbour for ships in the open waters of the Western Approaches. On 24 December 1838 the schooner Rival was trying to enter the harbour in a gale but came to grief on one of its piers; despite lacking proper rescue boats and equipment five people were saved after much courage and effort by the people ashore. A meeting was held and it was decided that a proper lifeboat should be built for the town. Francis Adams, a local man, had recently won a prize from the Royal Cornwall Polytechnic Society for designing a double-ended, self-righting lifeboat, and he was commissioned to now build one. The Hope entered service in 1840, assisting the Mary Ann of Poole during a storm on 7 April. Hope had fallen out of use by 1860 so the following year the RNLI opened a new lifeboat station at Porthgwidden beach. It proved to be a difficult site to launch from and so in 1867 it was closed. It has since been used as a store.

The replacement boat house was situated in Fore Street. This was used until 1911 when a new house was built on The Quay. Nearby Hayle Lifeboat Station closed in 1920. The St Ives boat now covered a larger area, but this was made easier in 1933 with the arrival of a first motor lifeboat. In 1964 an ILB was stationed at St Ives which was kept in a building in the Sloop Car Park on West Hill. These two boat houses were closed in 1993 when a new purpose-built house was opened at the landward end of West Pier. In 2015 the 1993 boathouse was modified for the new Shannon class lifeboat and its Supacat launching rig. The work involved widening the main doorway, installation of a new fuel tank and upgrading of crew facilities.

Wrecks
On 31 January 1938 the motor lifeboat Caroline Parsons went out in aid of the SS Alba. 23 people were rescued but as the lifeboat turned to head home it was capsized by a large wave that came from the side. It righted but ran aground on rocks. The lifeboat Coxswain Thomas Cocking and his eight crewmen got ashore safely but five of the rescued men were lost. Cocking was awarded the RNLI Medal in silver and the rest of the crew received bronze medals, but a year later six of them drowned in another lifeboat wreck.

A large steamship was reported to be in trouble off Cape Cornwall but the  lifeboat could not be launched due to the low state of the tide. At 3:00 AM the John and Sarah Eliza Stych was launched into the dark. Along with Cocking were seven more men: John Cocking (his son), Matthew Barber, William Barber and John Thomas who had all been in the Caroline Parsons wreck, along with Edgar Bassett, Richard Stevens, and William Freeman. The boat rounded The Island where it met the full force of the storm as it headed westwards. Off Clodgy Point it capsized but did what it was designed to do and righted itself. Five of the crew were in the sea; only Freeman made it back into the boat. The engine was restarted but the propeller was fouled and they drifted back towards The Island where they dropped anchor but the rope parted and it capsized and righted a second time; only three survived this time. The boat now drifted north-eastwards across St Ives Bay towards Godrevy Point where it capsized for a third time. When it righted only Freeman was left. He scrambled ashore when the boat was smashed on the rocks. All eight crew members were awarded bronze medals. Since then two more Tommy Cockings, the drowned coxswain's son and grandson, have served as coxswain on the St Ives Lifeboat.

Description
The lifeboat house is situated at the landward end of the West Pier facing a slipway into the harbour. Both boats are kept inside on carriages and launched with the aid of tractors. The building is built in local granite to blend with its surroundings. A large central portion houses the AWB. It is flanked by two wings, that on the harbour side for the IRB, the one on the town side is used as a fund-raising gift shop.

Area of operation
Adjacent all weather lifeboats are at Padstow Lifeboat Station to the east, and Sennen Cove Lifeboat Station to the west.

Fleet

All Weather Boats

Inshore lifeboats

See also
 List of RNLI stations

References

External links

 RNLI station information

Lifeboat stations in Cornwall
Buildings and structures in St Ives, Cornwall
1938 disasters in the United Kingdom